Music Tribe, formerly Music Group, is a holding company based in the City of Makati, Metro Manila, Philippines. It is chaired by Uli Behringer, founder of Behringer. Music Tribe's portfolio includes Behringer, Cool Audio, Midas, Turbosound, TC Electronic and TC-Helicon, Tannoy, Klark Teknik, Lab.gruppen, and Aston Microphones.

History
In December 2009, Music Group acquired Midas and Klark Teknik from Bosch Communications Systems (formerly Telex Communications) of Bosch Group. In 2012, Music Group acquired Turbosound, a UK-based loudspeaker manufacturer. In April 2015, Music Group acquired TC Group. In December 2017, Music Group rebranded to Music Tribe.

Factory complex 
In 2018, the company completed a manufacturing complex in Zhongshan, China. The complex contains factory buildings and dormitories for up to 10.000 workers. It opened with 3,000 employees.

Brands

Aston Microphones
Behringer
Bugera
Coolaudio
Klark Teknik
Lab.gruppen
Lake
Midas
Tannoy
TC Electronic
TC-Helicon
Turbosound

References

External links
 

Privately held companies
Holding companies of the Philippines
Audio equipment manufacturers of the Philippines
Companies based in Makati